Lydecker is the surname of:

The Lydecker brothers, Howard "Babe" Lydecker (1911-1969) and Theodore Lydecker (1908-1990), a movie special effects team
John Lydecker, a pen name of English writer Stephen Gallagher (born 1954)
Waldo Lydecker, a main character in the 1944 film noir Laura, played by Clifton Webb